The vesiculodeferential artery, also known as the middle vesical artery, is an artery that supplies blood to the seminal vesicles.

Structure 
The vesiculodeferential artery arises from the superior vesical artery, which is a branch of the umbilical artery.

Function 
The vesiculodeferential artery supplies oxygenated blood to the seminal vesicles.

History 
The vesiculodeferential artery is also known as the middle vesical artery.

References 

Arteries of the torso